The following is a timeline of history of the city of Gold Coast, Queensland, Australia.

19th Century
Pre 1846
Yugambeh people inhabit the region now known as the Gold Coast.
1846
The schooner Coolangatta is wrecked on the coast close to the later town.
1865
The township of Nerang was surveyed by Martin Lavelle in June.
1874
The town of Southport is founded.
1883
The town of Coolangatta is founded.
1889
The South Coast railway reaches Southport.

20th Century
1919
The 1918 flu pandemic closes the QLD-NSW border.
1922
Southport War Memorial built.
1925
Opening of the Jubilee bridge, connecting Elston to Southport.
1933
The town of Elston is officially renamed Surfers Paradise.
1934
Broadbeach is surveyed.
 1949
 Town of South Coast created through the amalgamation of Coolangatta and Southport.
 10 March: 1949 Queensland Airlines Lockheed Lodestar crash in Bilinga.
 1954
 An unnamed cyclone hits, leading to at least 26 deaths and extensive flooding.
 1958
 Town of South Coast renamed to Town of Gold Coast.
 1959
Town of Gold Coast renamed City of Gold Coast.
 1960
Kinkabool (building) constructed in Surfers Paradise.
 1962
Lido Arcade in Surfers Paradise opens.
 Magic Mountain, Nobby Beach opens.
 1963
Gold Coast Bulletin newspaper in publication.
 1964
Southport-Brisbane South Coast railway line closes.
 1966
 The Sands (building) and Paradise Towers constructed in Surfers Paradise.
 Gold Coast Bridge rebuilt.
 1967
 Garfield Towers built in Surfers Paradise.
 Bruce Small elected mayor.
 1971
 Sea World park opens in Southport.
Point Danger Light built.
 Population: 75,862.
 1973
 Robert Neumann elected mayor.
 1974
Currumbin Estuary Bridge opens.
 Surfers Paradise floods.
 1979
Gold Coast Marathon begins.
 1981
 Dreamworld amusement park in business in Coomera.
 Population: 177,264.
 1984
 The Coolangatta Gold ironman race begins.
 Cade's County Waterpark in business in Oxenford.
 Coolangatta Centenary commemorations
 1986
Gold Coast City Art Gallery opens.
 1987
Carrara Stadium opens.
Gold Coast College of Advanced Education established.
 1988
Bond University opens in Robina.
1989
Gold Coast College of Advanced Education is merged with Griffith University under the Dawkins Revolution of tertiary education.
 1990
 Gold Coast and Albert Genealogical Society active.
 Australia Fair Shopping Centre in business in Southport.
 1991
 Movie World amusement part in business in Oxenford.
 Magic Mountain, Nobby Beach shuts its doors.
 Population: 301,559.
 1995
 Shire of Albert becomes part of Gold Coast City.
 Ray Stevens becomes mayor.
Yugambeh Museum, Language and Heritage Research Centre opens. 
 1996
Moroccan (building) constructed in Surfers Paradise.
 1997
Gary Baildon becomes mayor.
 1999
Gold Coast Sporting Hall of Fame opens.

21st Century
 2000
 Palazzo Versace Australia hotel in business.
 Towers of Chevron Renaissance and Pacific Motorway built.
 2004
 Ron Clarke becomes mayor.
 Gold Coast Convention and Exhibition Centre opens in Broadbeach.
 2005 
Q1 (building) constructed.
 2006
The Wave (building) constructed.
 2007
 Gold Coast Titans rugby club formed.
 Circle on Cavill and Southport Central built.
 2008
 November: 2008 Queensland storms.
 Robina Stadium opens.
 2009
 Gold Coast Football Club formed.
 2010
 The Oracle constructed.
 2011
 Australian Sevens rugby contest relocates to Gold Coast.
 Population: 557,822 (urban agglomeration).
 2012
 Soul (building) constructed.
 Tom Tate becomes mayor.
 2013
 City Plan drafted.
Gold Coast University Hospital built by Griffith University.
2014
The G:link light rail is built.
2018
4-15 April: 2018 Commonwealth Games hosted by the city.

See also

 History of Gold Coast, Queensland
 List of mayors of Gold Coast

References

Bibliography

External links

 
 

 
Gold Coast
Gold Coast
Queensland timelines